Bukulja (Serbian Cyrillic: Букуља) is a mountain near Aranđelovac in central Serbia. This mountain is an extinct volcano, which has been proved by presence of granite rocks, which contains specific mineral composition. In the mountain foothills, there is water catchment Garaši, which provides Aranđelovac and nearby communities with fresh water.

The name of the mountain originates from the Serbian name for beech (bukva). Its slopes and its top are covered with dense woods of beech-trees. There are good paths and a paved road leading to the top. On the top there are a hunter's hostel, and many mountaineers and hunters visit them not only from Aranđelovac and its surroundings, but also from Belgrade and from other towns and villages of Serbia.

Bukulja is also known for the source of the mineral water Knjaz Miloš.

References

Mountains of Serbia
Rhodope mountain range